Jean Feuilley was a pilot engineer and cartographer who was sent to Réunion by the French East India Company to investigate the possibility of agricultural and marine exploitation. He arrived in the island in 1704 and the following year returned to France. His "Mission à l’île Bourbon du sieur Feuilley en 1704" (published 1705) contains among other things descriptions of now-extinct bird species, like the Réunion kestrel and the Réunion ibis.

References

French cartographers
French East India Company
French engineers
French male writers